The 1976 American 500 was the 28th official race (out of 30) in the NASCAR Winston Cup Series season.

Race report
This race took place on October 24, 1976, at North Carolina Motor Speedway in Rockingham, North Carolina. The race took four hours, fifteen minutes, and one second. Six cautions slowed the race for 35 laps.

Richard Petty would end up lapping the field as he scored the season sweep at Rockingham. Thirty-two thousand and five hundred spectators attended this event. David Pearson gained the pole position qualifying at a speed of  but eventually finished in sixth place. Henley Gray was the last-place finisher due to an engine issue on the first lap.

Notable crew chiefs in the race were Junie Donlavey, Jake Elder, Harry Hyde, Dale Inman, Bud Moore, Tim Brewer among others.

Richard Petty's teenage son Kyle would attend his father's victory celebrations; getting ready for his NASCAR career. Jack Donohue was the only Canadian competitor out of the 36-car grid.

Qualifying

Finishing order
Section reference: 

 Richard Petty
 Lennie Pond
 Darrell Waltrip
 Bobby Allison
 Cale Yarborough
 David Pearson
 Donnie Allison
 Dick Brooks
 Skip Manning
 Coo Coo Marlin
 Sonny Easley
 Grant Adcox
 Ed Negre
 D.K. Ulrich
 Cecil Gordon
 Buddy Arrington
 Terry Bivins
 Rick Newsom
 Jackie Rogers
 David Sisco
 Jack Donohue
 Frank Warren
 Jimmy Means
 Tommy Gale
 Dave Marcis
 J.D. McDuffie
 Richard Childress
 Buddy Baker
 James Hylton
 Dick May
 Benny Parsons
 Travis Tiller
 Bobby Wawak
 Gary Myers
 Bruce Hill
 Henley Gray

Timeline
Section reference: 
 Start: David Pearson was leading the racing grid as the first official lap commenced.
 Lap 2: Bruce Hill blew his engine while driving at high speeds.
 Lap 5: Gary Myers blew his engine while driving at high speeds.
 Lap 32: Dave Marcis took over the lead from David Pearson.
 Lap 76: Bobby Wawak managed to overheat his vehicle.
 Lap 85: Lennie Pond took over the lead from Dave Marcis.
 Lap 88: Travis Tiller blew his engine while driving at high speeds.
 Lap 96: Dave Marcis took over the lead from Lennie Pond.
 Lap 117: Benny Parsons blew his engine while driving at high speeds.
 Lap 127: Dick May blew his engine while driving at high speeds.
 Lap 171: The rear end of James Hylton's vehicle came off in an unsafe manner.
 Lap 180: Lennie Pond took over the lead from Dave Marcis.
 Lap 191: Dave Marcis took over the lead from Lennie Pond.
 Lap 208: Lennie Pond took over the lead from Dave Marcis.
 Lap 216: Donnie Allison took over the lead from Lennie Pond.
 Lap 217: Lennie Pond took over the lead from Donnie Allison.
 Lap 227: Richard Petty took over the lead from Lennie Pond.
 Lap 264: Lennie Pond took over the lead from Richard Petty.
 Lap 299: The throttle on Buddy Baker's vehicle was acting badly enough to knock him out of the race.
 Lap 322: Richard Petty took over the lead from Lennie Pond.
 Lap 324: Lennie Pond took over the lead from Richard Petty.
 Lap 329: Richard Petty took over the lead from Lennie Pond.
 Lap 363: Richard Childress blew his engine while driving at high speeds.
 Lap 389: J.D. McDuffie blew his engine while driving at high speeds.
 Lap 413: Lennie Pond took over the lead from Richard Petty, Dave Marcis blew his engine while driving at high speeds.
 Lap 423: Richard Petty took over the lead from Lennie Pond.
 Lap 486: Donnie Allison's fuel pump was beginning to cause problems for him.
 Finish: Richard Petty was officially declared the winner of the event.

Standings after the race

References

American 500
American 500
NASCAR races at Rockingham Speedway